Deltophalonia indanzae is a species of moth of the family Tortricidae. It is found in Morona-Santiago Province, Ecuador.

The wingspan is 20–24 mm. The ground colour of the forewings is pale brownish cream strigulated (finely streaked) with brown. The hindwings are brownish cream, strigulated with brownish except for the basal area.

Etymology
The species name refers to the type locality, Morona, Indanza.

References

Moths described in 2007
Cochylini